Dragon in Jail is a 1990 Hong Kong action film directed by Kent Cheng and starring Andy Lau, Kenny Ho and Gigi Lai.

Plot
Wayne Cheung (Kenny Ho) is a rich heir who impulsively committed a crime because he was unable to accept the fact that his mother remarried. After being sentenced to prison, he is bullied by his inmates but is helped by his roommate Henry (Andy Lau), whom he befriends. After release, Wayne goes to study law in Britain while Henry joins the triads due to his family environment. Two years later, Cheung returns and becomes a lawyer while Henry also becomes a gang leader. Due to his conflict with another triad leader Charlie Ma (William Ho), Henry's pregnant wife Winnie (Gigi Lai) is raped and killed. Henry later takes revenge on Ma, and although successful, he is imprisoned again and Wayne becomes his defensive lawyer. With the help of Wayne and his friend Skinny (John Ching), will Henry be released from prison?

Cast
Andy Lau as Henry Tse
Kenny Ho as Wayne Cheung
Gigi Lai as Winnie Sung
Lung Fong as CK Chong
John Ching as Skinny
William Ho as Charlie Ma
Melvin Wong as Prison officer
Tomi Wong as Wayne's mother
Wai Kei-shun as Wayne's stepfather
Victor Hon as Henry's father
Lam Yin-ming as Mandy
Lam Chung as Sergeant Fung
Stephen Chang
Shing Fuk-on as Brother Bull
Leung Kam-san as Sean Man Cheung Hung
Law Shu-kei as Judge
Lau Yuk-kei as Peter
Yeung Kin-wai
Jimmy Sin
Lee Chun-kit as Sergeant Fung's assistant
Kong Foo-keung as Triad
Gary Chan
Gloria Lam
Fung Chi-sing
Billy Lam
Lit Foo
Rolf Chow
Cheung Kwong-lun
Kong Kin-san
Yam Hok-chung
Tse Kai-ming
Lam Che-chung
Wong Leun-cheung
Xie De-ming
Ho Chi-moon
Simon Cheung
KK Wong
Chun Kwai-po as Thug
Cheung Siu
Choi Sai
Wong Man-chun

Theme song
Red Angel (紅塵天使)
Composer: Steve Chow
Lyricist: Andy Lau
Singer: Andy Lau

Box office
The film grossed HK$10,451,120 at the Hong Kong box office during its theatrical run from 27 September to 24 October 1990 in Hong Kong.

See also
Andy Lau filmography

External links

Dragon in Jail at Hong Kong Cinemagic

1990 films
1990 martial arts films
1990 action films
1990s prison films
Hong Kong martial arts films
Hong Kong action films
Hong Kong prison films
Triad films
1990s Cantonese-language films
Films set in Hong Kong
Films shot in Hong Kong
Films directed by Kent Cheng
1990s Hong Kong films